Zarak-e Tang Khas (also Romanized as Zarak-e Tang Khāş) is a village in Javid-e Mahuri Rural District, in the Central District of Mamasani County, Fars Province, Iran. At the 2006 census, its population was 54, in 13 families.

References 

Populated places in Mamasani County